Robert Beck (born Robert Lee Maupin or Robert Moppins Jr.; August 4, 1918 – April 30, 1992), better known as Iceberg Slim, was a former American pimp who later became a writer. Beck's novels were adapted into films.

Early life
Robert Maupin was born in Chicago, Illinois. He spent his childhood in Milwaukee, Wisconsin, and Rockford, Illinois, until he returned to Chicago. When his mother was abandoned by his father, she established a beauty shop and worked as a domestic to support both of them in Milwaukee.  In his autobiography, Maupin expressed gratitude to his mother for not also abandoning him.  She earned enough money working in her salon to give her son the privileges of a middle-class life such as a college education, which at that time was difficult for the average person.

Slim attended Tuskegee University in Tuskegee, Alabama, but having spent time in the "street culture", he soon began bootlegging and was expelled as a result. After his expulsion, his mother encouraged him to become a criminal lawyer so that he could make a legitimate living while continuing to work with the street people he was so fond of, but Maupin, seeing the pimps bringing women into his mother's beauty salon, was far more attracted to the lifestyle of money and control over women that pimping provided.

Pimp
According to his memoir, Pimp, Slim started pimping at 18 and continued until age 42. The book claims that during his career he had over 400 women, both black and white, working for him. He said he was known for his frosty temperament and for staying calm in emergencies, which, combined with his slim build, earned him the street name Iceberg Slim. When verbal instruction and psychological manipulation failed to keep the women compliant, he beat them with wire hangers; in his autobiography he concedes he was a ruthless, vicious man.

Slim had been connected with several other well-known pimps, one of them Albert "Baby" Bell, a man born in 1899 who had been pimping for decades and had a Duesenberg and a bejeweled pet ocelot. Another pimp, who had gotten Slim hooked on cocaine, went by the name of "Satin" and was a major drug figure in the eastern part of the country.

Throughout his pimping career, Slim, who was known as Cavanaugh Slim, was noted for being able to effectively conceal his emotions,  something he said he learned from Baby Bell: "A pimp has gotta know his whores, but not let them know him; he's gotta be god all the way."

Writing
In 1961, after serving 10 months of solitary confinement in a Cook County jail, Maupin decided he was too old for a life of pimping (he was 42) and was unable to compete with younger, more ruthless pimps.

In 1961, Maupin moved to Los Angeles and changed his name to Robert Beck, taking the last name of the man his mother was married to at the time.  He met Betty Shue, who became his common-law wife and the mother of his three daughters, while he was working as an insecticide salesman. Betty encouraged Beck to write the story of his life as a novel, and they began sporadically writing some draft chapters. According to her, a white writer, whom Beck would later only refer to as "the Professor", became interested in writing Beck's life story; Beck became convinced that the man was trying to steal their idea for himself, so they cut him out of the deal and finished it without him.  Bentley Morris of Holloway House recognized the merit of Pimp, and it was published in 1967.

The hip-hop writer Mark Skillz wrote that when Beck began work on Pimp, "he made two promises to himself: no glamorizing his former life and no snitching." Hip hop artist Fab 5 Freddy, a friend of Beck's, claimed that "Many of Bob's friends were still alive when he wrote that book. So he changed all of their names and descriptions. 'Baby' Bell became 'Sweet' Jones, his best friend 'Satin' became 'Glass Top', and he created composite characters of some of his former 'employees.

Reviews of Pimp were mixed. Beck's vision was considerably bleaker than most other Black writers of the time; his work tended to be based on his personal experiences in the criminal underworld and revealed a world of seemingly bottomless brutality and viciousness. His was the first insider look into the world of Black pimps, to be followed by a half-dozen pimp memoirs by other writers.

In 1973, Hollie West questioned in The Washington Post whether societal changes and the women's movement would soon render the outlook expressed in Pimp obsolete: "The Iceberg Slim of yesteryear is considered an anachronism to the young dudes now out there on the block trying to hustle. They say he is crude and violent, overlooking his tremendous gift of the gab. Iceberg acknowledges that pimping has changed because 'women have changed.' The advent of women's lib, changing sexual mores, general affluence in this society and widespread use of drugs by pimps to control prostitutes have made an impact."
 
Pimp sold very well, mainly among Black audiences. By 1973, it had been reprinted 19 times and had sold nearly 2 million copies. Pimp was eventually translated into German, French, Italian, Portuguese, Spanish, Dutch, Swedish, Finnish, and Greek.

Following Pimp, Beck wrote several more novels, an autobiography, and a story collection. He sold over six million books before his death in 1992, making him one of the best-selling African-American writers.

Recordings
In 1976, Iceberg Slim released the album Reflections, in which he recited passages from his autobiography over a funky musical backing supplied by the Red Holloway Quartet.  The album, produced by David Drozen, was initially released on ALA records. It was reissued by Infinite Zero in 1994, then by Uproar Entertainment in 2008.  Reviewing the album for AllMusic, Victor W. Valdivia wrote "For those who aren't easily offended, this album will be spellbinding.  Slim's skills as a storyteller cannot be overstated; even at his crudest, he still spins riveting yarns."  Valdivia praised the record for "the mixture of street smarts and the intellectual and emotional depth shown here", which, he said,  was often lacking in Iceberg Slim's followers.

A popular Audiobook adaption of his autobiography “Pimp, The Story of My Life” narrated by Cary Hite, was released by Urban Audiobooks in 2011, and has become very popular due to the realistic portrayal talents of the voice actor. Cary later went on to voice other works of Iceberg Slim, including Long White Con, Trick Baby, and Airtight Willie and Me.

Film adaptations
Slim's first novel, Trick Baby, was adapted as an eponymous 1972 movie directed by Larry Yust and produced independently for $600,000, with a cast of unknowns. Universal Pictures acquired the film for $1,000,000 and released it in 1973 to a considerable amount of Iceberg Slim fanfare; the movie grossed $11,000,000 at the US box office. The New York Times praised the film for its depiction of race relations and the friendship between two con men, set "in the grimier reaches of Philadelphia".
 
In 2006, independent film producers Dave Mortell and David Harb acquired the film rights to produce Mama Black Widow.

In 2009, television executive producer Rob Weiss, of the HBO show Entourage, and Mitch Davis purchased the film rights to produce Pimp.

Personal life
After his release from prison in 1961, Beck met Betty Shue, who became his common-law wife and the mother of his three daughters (Melody, Misty and Camille) and one son (Leon) while he was working as an insecticide salesman. Shue encouraged Beck to write his life story and helped him write drafts.

Beck married Diane Millman Beck in 1982.

Death
According to Beck's widow, Diane Millman Beck, Beck's final years were plagued by financial worries and deteriorating health. Beck suffered from diabetes and became increasingly reclusive. He died from liver failure on April 30, 1992, aged 73. In 2005, Diane Millman Beck and Beck's three daughters from his previous relationship, Melody, Misty and Camille, filed suit against Holloway House for back payment of royalties. They claimed in their suit that Robert Beck died penniless.

Beck's remains are interred at Forest Lawn Memorial Park in Glendale, California.

Influence
Scottish author Irvine Welsh said: "Iceberg Slim did for the pimp what Jean Genet did for the homosexual and thief and William Burroughs did for the junkie: he articulated the thoughts and feelings of someone who had been there."

Academia
Welsh adds that a course at Harvard University featured Pimp as a "transgressive novel".

Comedy
In his special The Bird Revelation, comedian Dave Chappelle used the life of Iceberg Slim and the world of his book Pimp as a parable for his experience in show business.
 Eddie Murphy's character Velvet Jones, from Saturday Night Live, has been described as a spoof of Iceberg Slim.

Films 
In 1970, incarcerated Bay Area pimp Robert Poole was influenced by Beck's Pimp while writing a screenplay about his life, The Mack and His Pack. The film was released under the title The Mack (1973),  starring Max Julien and Richard Pryor.
Ice-T produced the documentary Iceberg Slim: Portrait of a Pimp (2012), told through talking-head admirers, including Chris Rock, Snoop Dogg, Ice-T, Henry Rollins, Quincy Jones, and others. The film was directed by Jorge Hinojosa and premiered at the Toronto International Film Festival on September 8, 2012.

Literature
Author Donald Goines acknowledged the strong influence of Beck's Pimp when he created his urban fiction set in a black milieu. Goines was also published by Bentley Morris of Holloway House.
Peter A. Muckley published Iceberg Slim: The Life as Art (2003), a critical study of the fiction of Iceberg Slim.

Music
Slim is an important influence on hip-hop artists. For example:
Many of the current musical references to pimp culture, for example in the work of Snoop Dogg and Too Short, can be traced back to Iceberg Slim.
Iceberg Slim's last book, Doom Fox (written in 1978 but not published until 1998), contains an introduction written by Ice-T.
Spiceberg Slim is a moniker and the eighth studio album (released in 2002) by American rapper Spice 1.
On Xiu Xiu's album Fabulous Muscles, the title track is subtitled "(Mama Black Widow Version)".
Australian rock band Doomfoxx adopted their name from the novel Doom Fox.

Bibliography
Iceberg Slim's writings include both fiction and nonfiction:
Pimp: The Story of My Life (1967, Holloway House), memoir
Trick Baby: The Biography of a Con Man (1967, Holloway House), novel
Mama Black Widow: A Story of the South's Black Underworld (1969, Holloway House), novel
The Naked Soul of Iceberg Slim: Robert Beck's Real Story (1971, Holloway House), autobiography
Long White Con: The Biggest Score of His Life (1977, Holloway House), novel
Death Wish: A Story of the Mafia (1977, Holloway House), novel
Airtight Willie & Me (1985, Holloway House), story collection
Doom Fox (written 1978, published posthumously 1998), novel
Shetani's Sister (published posthumously 2015), novel
Night Train to Sugar Hill (Contra Mundum Press, 2019), Slim's final novel

See also
 African-American literature

References

Further reading 

 Nishikawa, Kinohi. "The Player: Iceberg Slim and the Allure of the Street." In Sticking it to the Man: Revolution and Counterculture in Pulp and Popular Fiction, 1950-1980. Andrew Nette and Iain McIntyre, editors. Oakland, California: PM Press, 2020. . pages 85–93.

External links 
 
  

1918 births
1992 deaths
20th-century American businesspeople
20th-century American novelists
African-American novelists
American crime fiction writers
American male novelists
20th-century American memoirists
American pimps
Writers from Milwaukee
Writers from Rockford, Illinois
Writers from Chicago
Tuskegee University alumni
Deaths from liver failure
20th-century American male writers
Novelists from Illinois
Novelists from Wisconsin
Burials at Forest Lawn Memorial Park (Glendale)
People with diabetes
American male non-fiction writers
20th-century pseudonymous writers
20th-century African-American writers